was a Japanese journalist. He was known for his articles on Japanese social problems.

History 
Tachibana graduated from the University of Tokyo, majoring in French literature. At one point he served in the magazine Bungeishunjū, however, he only worked there for two years, quitting after being assigned to write articles about professional baseball. He returned to school at Tokyo University, during which time he wrote numerous nonfiction articles for the magazine Shokun!. Among the articles were ones on topics such as the Scientific Revolution, space travel, and crude oil. Because of his numerous works and essays, he was dubbed an "intellectual giant" by many in Japan.

He voiced Seiya Tsukishima in Whisper of the Heart.

Death 
Tachibana died April 30, 2020, due to acute coronary syndrome. His family made the announcement of his death on June 23, 2020.

Notable issues 
 : 1974
 : 1981 to 1985
 : 1978
 : 1996

References

External links 
 

1940 births
2021 deaths
People from Nagasaki
People from Mito, Ibaraki
University of Tokyo alumni
Japanese journalists
Japanese essayists
Japanese anti-communists
Lockheed bribery scandals